The third Weil cabinet is the current state government of Lower Saxony, sworn in on 8 November 2022 after Stephan Weil was elected as Minister-President of Lower Saxony by the members of the Landtag of Lower Saxony. It is the 30th Cabinet of Lower Saxony.

It was formed after the 2022 Lower Saxony state election by the Social Democratic Party (SPD) and Alliance 90/The Greens (GRÜNE). Excluding the Minister-President, the cabinet comprises ten ministers. Six are members of the SPD and four are members of the Greens.

Formation 

The previous cabinet was a coalition government of the SPD and Christian Democratic Union (CDU) led by Minister-President Stephan Weil of the SPD.

The election took place on 9 October 2022, and resulted in losses for both governing parties. The SPD remained the largest party and increased its lead over the CDU. The opposition Greens increased their vote share to a record 14.5%, while the AfD also improved to 11%.

Overall, the incumbent coalition retained its majority. Minister-President Weil ruled out continuing the grand coalition and voiced his preference for a coalition with the Greens. Four days after the election on 13 October, the SPD and Greens agreed to preliminary discussions, with the goal of finalising government negotiations by 3 November. Formal coalition talks began on schedule on 26 October and concluded successfully just a few days later on 31 October. The coalition pact was approved by both parties and signed on 7 November.

Weil was elected as Minister-President by the Landtag on 8 November 2022, winning 82 votes out of 145 cast.

Composition

External links

References 

Cabinets of Lower Saxony
State governments of Germany
Cabinets established in 2022
2022 establishments in Germany
Weil